Adam Anderson, Lord Anderson  FRSE (5 March 1797 – 28 September 1853) was a Scottish judge and Senator of the College of Justice.

Life
Anderson was the second son of Samuel Anderson of Moredun, an Edinburgh banker, and Jane Hay. The family lived at 41 George Street, then a new building in the still-growing New Town.

He qualified as an Advocate in 1818. From 1835 to 1841 he was Sheriff of Perth. He served as Solicitor General for Scotland from 1842 to 1846 and as Lord Advocate from February to May 1852.

In 1850 he was living at 98 George Street in Edinburgh.

Anderson was elected a Fellow of the Royal Society of Edinburgh on 5 February 1849.

He died at Upper Brook Street in London, age 56.

Character

Anderson is described in the journal of James Robertson, sheriff-substitute, in his entry for 22 November 1842 as follows:

References

1797 births
1853 deaths
Lawyers from Edinburgh
Anderson
Solicitors General for Scotland
Lord Advocates
Fellows of the Royal Society of Edinburgh
19th-century Scottish judges
Members of the Faculty of Advocates
Scottish sheriffs